Line 11 of the Beijing Subway is a rapid transit line of the Beijing Subway. The line opened on December 31, 2021.

Opening timeline

Stations

History

Old planning
In 2006, Line 11 was originally designed as an L-shaped line from Wanliu to Dahongmen, which together with the L-shaped Line 10, form a subway ring route. After Line 10 Phase II took over the entire ring route, Line 11 was displaced.

In January 2010, the government of Shijingshan District disclosed plans for a Line 11 in western Beijing that would traverse the Shougang (Beijing Capital Steel) complex and intersect with Lines 4 and 16.

Phase 1
Construction started on November 13, 2019. It is fully underground.

,  and  stations opened on December 31, 2021.  station will open in 2023.

Phase 2

References 

Beijing Subway lines
Transport infrastructure under construction in China
Railway lines opened in 2021
1500 V DC railway electrification